The 1928 Iowa Hawkeyes football team represented the University of Iowa in the 1928 college football season. This was the last season Iowa played their home games in at Iowa Field. The team was ranked No. 6 in the nation in the Dickinson System ratings released in December 1928.

Schedule

References

Iowa
Iowa Hawkeyes football seasons
Iowa Hawkeyes football